Roxana Elisabeta Rotaru, née Bârcă (born 22 June 1988 in Bucharest) is a Romanian long-distance runner. She represented her country in the 5000 metres at the 2010 European Athletics Championships. She also competed at the 2011 European Athletics Indoor Championships, coming tenth in the 3000 metres.

She came third at the World University Cross Country Championships in 2012 and was part of the silver medal-winning Romanian team alongside Ancuta Bobocel.

She is previously served a two-year doping ban for the use of a prohibited substance, Methasterone, at the 2013 Summer Universiade, where she originally won the gold medal in the 5000 metres. The ban lasted from 11 July 2013 to 3 September 2015.

Achievements

References

1988 births
Living people
Sportspeople from Bucharest
Romanian female long-distance runners
Olympic athletes of Romania
Athletes (track and field) at the 2012 Summer Olympics
Doping cases in athletics
Romanian sportspeople in doping cases
Competitors at the 2011 Summer Universiade
Competitors at the 2013 Summer Universiade